Khamphoui (12 July 1912 – 1982?) was the Queen of Laos by marriage to Sisavang Vatthana, the second (and last) King of Laos. She was arrested with the rest of her family and reportedly died in a re-education camp in 1982.

Early life

She was born in Luang Phrabang, then capital city of the Kingdom of Luang Phrabang (now part of Laos) in French Indochina, on 12 July 1912. 

On 7 August 1930, she married Sisavang Vatthana and they had five children: Crown Prince Vong Savang, Prince Savang, Prince Sauryavong Savang, Princess Savivanh Savang, and Princess Thala Savang. She had a happy marriage with King Sisavang Vatthana, who abolished polygamy.

Queen of Laos

She became Queen Consort of Laos in late October 1959. As queen, she and her husband attended public events and ceremonies. In 1963, she accompanied the king on an official state visit to the United States, where they were hosted by President Kennedy.

Her husband was forced to abdicate the Throne on 2 December 1975. After the coup, the former royal couple lived in house arrest in the former royal palace. 
She was arrested in 1977 along with the former King and her family, and sent to a Communist 're-education camp'.  After their arrest, the former Royal Palace was made in to a museum, and the former king and queen were stated to have been taken away to "work in the fields".

She reportedly died in 1982 in a Communist 're-education camp' in northern Laos along with her husband and their son Crown Prince Vong Savang, probably around Sop Hao.

Honours
 Dame Grand Cross of the Order of Chula Chom Klao

References

External links
Laos – "seminar Camps" And The Death Of King Savang Vatthana
Photographs of Royal Family of Laos

1912 births
1981 deaths
Laotian royalty
20th-century Laotian women
Laotian people who died in prison custody
Prisoners who died in Laotian detention
People from Luang Prabang